The Twin Lakes are two adjacent alpine Glacial lakes separated by a narrow strip of land less than  wide in Blaine County, Idaho, United States, located in the Sawtooth Mountains in the Sawtooth National Recreation Area.  The lakes eventually flow into the Salmon River. Sawtooth National Forest trail 092 leads to the twin lakes.

Description 
The Twin Lakes are in the Sawtooth Wilderness, and a wilderness permit can be obtained at a registration box at trailheads or wilderness boundaries.  The lakes are just upstream of Alice Lake and several miles upstream of Pettit Lake.

References

See also

 List of lakes of the Sawtooth Mountains (Idaho)
 Sawtooth National Forest
 Sawtooth National Recreation Area
 Sawtooth Range (Idaho)

Lakes of Idaho
Lakes of Blaine County, Idaho
Glacial lakes of the United States
Glacial lakes of the Sawtooth Wilderness